Peltophorum dubium is a tree in the family Fabaceae and subfamily Caesalpinioideae. This species is known as the Ibirá-pitá in Argentina and Paraguay, árbol de Artigas in Uruguay, and Cambuí  in Brazil. It is a large tree, growing around 20–25 meters, with a more or less straight trunk.
 Foliage: bright green, and deciduous
 Leaves: compound, bipinnate, large. Numerous leaves with a central nervous system.
 Flowers: from 2 cm in diameter, arranged in bundles that end in spikes. The bright visible flowers are in corollas. They flower in the summer and at the beginning of autumn.
 Fruits: indehiscent legume, flat, leathery, and brown.
 Seeds: cylindrical with hard nuts.

Habitat 
They grow on the riverbanks in the south of Brazil, the northeast of Argentina and Paraguay and in the north of Uruguay. They have also been planted along the avenues of Buenos Aires and Montevideo. They are tropical trees, but can grow to quite large specimens in temperate climates.

References

External links

 

dubium
Trees of Argentina
Trees of Brazil
Trees of Uruguay
Trees of Paraguay
Ornamental trees